Kyle Hart may refer to:

 Kyle Hart (baseball) (born 1992), American professional baseball pitcher
 Kyle Hart, fictional character on the TV series Hit the Floor